Kanpur Metropolitan Bus Service (KMBS), is a committee which oversees bus service in the Kanpur metropolitan area.

History

The city bus service began in 2006 with a fleet of 100 buses. The city buses were brought under the control of Jawaharlal Nehru National Urban Renewal Mission (JNNURM), the Indian government's urban-modernisation scheme, in 2009..The service, formerly known as Mahanagar Bus Seva in Hindi, began operating on 6 July 1922.

Routes

The following table includes private bus routes.

Airport service

KMBS operates air-conditioned buses from outlying areas to Kanpur Airport. The route includes:

IIT Gate
Kalianpur Railway Station
Kanpur University Gate
Gurudev Crossing
Vikas Nagar Bus Depot
KDA Signature
Allen Forest Zoological Park
Dr. Tilak Crossing
Company Bagh Crossing
Emerald Garden
Gastro Liver Hospital
Hallet Crossing 
GSVM Medical College
Model Town
Mariampur Hospital
Chawla Crossing
Nirala Nagar
Gaushala Road Crossing
Naubasta Crossing
Via Bypass Flyover:
U-turn near Chakeri
U-turn near Axis Bank ATM Ahirwan
Airport

References

Metropolitan transport agencies of India
Transport in Kanpur
2006 establishments in Uttar Pradesh
Transport companies established in 2006
Indian companies established in 2006
Companies based in Kanpur